Cage of Girls (French: La cage aux filles) is a 1949 French drama film directed by Maurice Cloche and starring Danièle Delorme, Jacky Flynt and Louise Lagrange. It is set in a women's prison.

The film's sets were designed by René Renoux.

Cast
 Danièle Delorme as Micheline  
 Jacky Flynt  as Rita  
 Louise Lagrange as Alice Baudoin  
 Denise Bosc as La Mère Supérieure  
 Lise Topart as Sarah  
 Michel Marsay as Freddy  
 André Pasdoc as L'Aumônier  
 Geymond Vital as Pierre Mansois, oncle de Micheline  
 Jacques Verrières as Loulou  
 Jean-Marc Thibault as Edmond  
 Van Mullen
 Carbonnat
 Robichez
 Marc Anthony
 Eliane Charles as Tototte  
 Jacqueline Dor as Suzanne  
 Nicole Francis
 Muni 
 Palmyre Levasseur as La surveillante en chef  
 Yvonne Hébert as La Femme de Freddy  
 Gaby Tyra
 Françoise Beauté
 Annie Noël
 Sylvie Pelayo
 Annick Martin
 France Marion 
 Suzanne Flon as Mme. Edith  
 Noël Roquevert as Antoine Baudoin, le beau-père de Micheline  
 Marina de Berg as Colette  
 Hélène Rémy 
 Nina Lazareff
 Françoise Barles 
 Ginette Frank 
 Liliane Charpentier
 Madeleine Barbulée as Une surveillante  
 Joëlle Janin
 Dominique Davray as Une élève du cours  
 Susi Jera
 Christine Langart
 Jane Daury
 Yvonne Dany 
 Max Rogerys

References

Bibliography 
 Crisp, C.G. The classic French cinema, 1930-1960. Indiana University Press, 1993

External links 
 

1949 films
1949 drama films
French drama films
1940s French-language films
Films directed by Maurice Cloche
French black-and-white films
1940s French films